Budokan: The Martial Spirit is a fighting game published by Electronic Arts in 1989 for the Amiga and MS-DOS compatible operating systems. The game pits the player against other martial artists in a  tournament known as the Budokan at the Nippon Budokan in Tokyo. Ports for the Sega Genesis, Commodore 64, ZX Spectrum, and Amstrad CPC were released in 1991.

Gameplay 

The player begins the game as an apprentice in the Tobiko-Ryu Dojo, and initially practices skills in four dojos, either Shadow Fighting (Jiyu-renshu) or sparring with an instructor (Kumite). The weapons and combat methods available to the player consist of:

Bo: classic Japanese long staff
Karate: Okinawan unarmed combat
Kendo: Japanese fencing utilizing a wooden sword
Nunchaku: swinging weapon with two shafts connected by a chain

Once the player is confident in their skills, they can go to the Free Spar mat to engage a human or computer opponent, or enter the Budokan tournament where the player faces consecutive opponents equipped with various weapons or combat forms (including, but not limited to, those available to the player).  During the tournament the difficulty gradually increases, with each opponent demonstrating increasing prowess when compared to the previous.  Most opponents are male, except for one female armed with a naginata.  The gender of a ninjutsu opponent with a masked face is presumably female, as they are named Ayako.

Each match is preceded by a briefing screen which provides the player with a short description of the upcoming opponent. The player chooses a weapon to use in the match; however, each weapon or combat form may only be used a maximum of four times, requiring strategic choices in order to fight effectively. After three consecutive losses to the same opponent, the player must face the previous one again. The game ends if the player loses three times to the first opponent or runs out of weapons.

There are two primary attributes shown on the screen -- stamina and ki, the power of each blow.  Active movements like jumping and delivering difficult blows decrease the ki, while blocking attacks increases it.  As a fighter's stamina decreases, movements slow down, making it more difficult to act.  The first fighter whose stamina is completely exhausted loses the match.

Reception 

The game was reviewed in 1990 in Dragon #161 by Hartley, Patricia, and Kirk Lesser in "The Role of Computers" column. The reviewers gave the game 4 out of 5 stars. Console XS praised the Sega Genesis version having a terrific atmosphere although criticizing Budokan for being a "shallow beat-‘em-up with few opponents and limited moves." MegaTech described Budokan as a "Thinking man’s beat-‘em-up" and praised the graphics and sound.

Legacy 
In August 2006, GameSpot reported that Electronic Arts would be porting the Genesis version of Budokan to the PlayStation Portable as part of EA Replay.

References

External links 

Budokan at Lemon Amiga
Budokan at Spectrum Computing

1989 video games
Electronic Arts games
Fighting games
Amiga games
DOS games
Sega Genesis games
ZX Spectrum games
Commodore 64 games
Video games scored by Rob Hubbard
Video games set in Tokyo
Japan in non-Japanese culture
Video games developed in the United States